The following radio stations broadcast on AM frequency 950 kHz: The Federal Communications Commission categorizes 950 AM as a regional frequency.

Argentina
 CNN Radio Argentina in Buenos Aires
 LT16 RSP in Presidente Roque Saenz Peña

Brazil
 ZYH 593 in Sobral, Ceará
 ZYH 915 in João Lisboa, Maranhão
 ZYL 212 in Belo Horizonte, Minas Gerais
 ZYI 681 in Sousa, Paraíba
 ZYI 923 in Padre Marcos, Piauí
 ZYK 260 in Lajeado, Rio Grande do Sul
 ZYK 510 in Vera Cruz, São Paulo

Canada

Mexico
 XEFA-AM in Chihuahua, Chihuahua
 XEKAM-AM in Rosarito, Baja California
 XEMAB-AM in Ciudad del Carmen, Campeche
 XEMEX-AM in Ciudad Guzmán, Jalisco
 XEOJN-AM in San Lucas Ojitlán, Oaxaca

United States

References

Lists of radio stations by frequency